Circle-c, ©, (c), or variation, may refer to:

 Circle C Ranch, a subdivision in Austin, Texas, USA
 Copyright symbol (©) a circle circumscribing a "c"
 Circle C (©), the former name of Copyright (band)
 Enclosed C (Ⓒ,ⓒ) a "C" inscribed inside a circle

See also
 (C) (disambiguation)
 Copyright symbol (disambiguation)
 C (disambiguation)